Lindberg A/S is a Danish company which makes eyewear such as spectacle frames and sunglasses. The business was founded by Poul-Jørn Lindberg in 1969. The CEO is Henrik Lindberg. In 1983, it collaborated with architect Hans Dissing to create an innovative style of frame made from titanium wire, which has won several design awards.

In July 2021, the luxury group Kering acquired a 100% stake in Lindberg.

References

External links
Lindberg – official website

Eyewear brands of Denmark
Danish companies established in 1969
2021 mergers and acquisitions